Anura C. Perera (born 18 June 1947) is a Sri Lankan science writer and astronomer. He resides in the United States.

Early life 
Perera was born in Colombo to parents Aleck Fedrick Perera and Dona Charlet Benaragama. He was educated at Nalanda College, Colombo. He has an elder sister Indrani and younger brother Suraj.

Career 
He was deputy editor of Sri Lanka's first science magazine, Vidumina. In 1971 he was awarded the Science award for his book Sun & Planets.

References

External links 
 

 

 

 

 

 

1947 births
Living people
Sri Lankan Buddhists
Alumni of Nalanda College, Colombo
Sri Lankan novelists
Sinhalese writers
American people of Sri Lankan descent
Sinhalese academics